The name Demetrius occurs in two places in the New Testament:

 a Diana-worshipping silversmith who incited a riot against the Apostle Paul in the city of Ephesus.
Possibly the bearer of the letters of 1, 2 and 3 John, Demetrius is commended to the early Christian leader Gaius as one who upholds the truth of the Gospel, and as such should be welcomed and provided for.

See also
 Demetrius

References

People in the catholic epistles
People in Acts of the Apostles